Danjiang may refer to:

China
Dan River (China), a river in Shaanxi, Henan, and Hubei, a tributary of the Han River
Danjiang Subdistrict (丹江街道), a subdistrict of Dunhua, Jilin
Danjiang, Guizhou (丹江镇), a town in Leishan County, Guizhou

Taiwan
Danjiang Bridge, a proposed bridge over Tamsui River in New Taipei
Tamkang University, in Tamsui District, New Taipei